Antonio "Tony" LaMadrid (born 1968; died 1991) was both a patient and research subject at the University of California, Los Angeles (UCLA) Medical Center. He is believed to have committed suicide by jumping off the roof of a nine-story building. His death led to a federal investigation by the Office for Human Research Protections/Office of Protection from Research Risks that concluded UCLA had violated aspects of informed consent. The research subjects were not told how severe their possible relapses might be.

LaMadrid had schizophrenia and the research study he was involved in was titled, "Developmental Processes in Schizophrenic Disorders". The study began in 1983 and was run by psychologist Keith H. Nuechterlein, and psychiatrist Michael Gitlin.

References

1968 births
Medical controversies in the United States
1991 suicides
Suicides by jumping in California
People with schizophrenia